Carlos Pellegrini (1846–1906) was President of Argentina, 1890–1892.

Carlos Pellegrini may also refer to:

 Carlos Pellegrini (Buenos Aires Metro), a station of the Buenos Aires Metro
 Carlos Pellegrini, Santa Fe, a town in Santa Fe Province, Argentina
 Colonia Carlos Pellegrini, a town in Corrientes Province, Argentina
 Gran Premio Carlos Pellegrini, a Grade 1 horse race in Argentina
 Carlos Alberto Pellegrini, American surgeon

See also
 Carlo Pellegrini (disambiguation)

Pellegrini, Carlos